Events from the year 1981 in Taiwan, Republic of China. This year is numbered Minguo 70 according to the official Republic of China calendar.

Incumbents
 President – Chiang Ching-kuo
 Vice President – Hsieh Tung-min
 Premier – Sun Yun-suan
 Vice Premier – Hsu Ching-chung, Chiu Chuang-huan

Events

January
 11 January – The opening of Alishan Station in Alishan Township, Chiayi County.

March
 2 March – The establishment of Construction and Planning Agency in Taipei.
 29 March – 12th National Congress of Kuomintang in Taipei.

April
 1 April – The opening of Far Eastern Memorial Hospital in Banqiao City, Taipei County.

July
 1 July
 The establishment of Chung-Hua Institution for Economic Research in Taipei.
 The official establishment of Taitung Airport in Taitung County.

August
 22 August – The crash of Far Eastern Air Transport Flight 103 over Taipei.

October
 31 October – The establishment of Chung Cheng Aviation Museum in Taoyuan County (now Taoyuan City).

December
 25 December – The upgrade of Douliu, Magong, Miaoli, Nantou and Xinying from urban townships to a county-administered cities.

Births
 9 January – Sun Shu-may, pop singer, actress and TV host
 22 January – Alan Ko, singer and actor
 2 February – Peggy Hsu, singer-songwriter, music composer and music producer
 4 February – Tsai Shu-min, swimmer
 17 February – Hope Lin, actress
 22 March
 Frankie Huang, actor and television host
 Kaiser Chuang, actor
 25 March – Yang Sen, professional baseball player
 1 April – Annie Liu, actress
 13 May – Jag Huang, actor
 24 May – Linda Liao, singer, actress, VJ and gamer
 30 May – Deserts Chang, singer and songwriter
 18 June – Ella Chen, singer and actress
 8 August – Candie Kung, golfer
 16 August – Wan Wan, actress
 24 August – Jiro Wang, model, actor and singer
 2 October – Timi Zhuo, singer and actress
 14 October – Roy Chiu, actor, singer and race driver
 26 October – Chou Ssu-chi, baseball player
 31 October – Selina Jen, singer and actress
 1 November – Lin Tzu-hui, weightlifter athlete
 11 November – Sharon Hsu, actor and singer
 16 November – Yvonne Yao, actress
 20 November – Athena Lee Yen, actress

Deaths
 5 February – Feng Yong, educator, military leader and politician 
 20 November – George Yeh, Minister of Foreign Affairs (1949–1958)

References

 
Years of the 20th century in Taiwan